Wangzuo Town a town on the southwest of Fengtai District, Beijing, China. It is bordering Yongding Township to the north, Beigong Town and Yungang Subdistrict to the east, Changyang Town, Gongcheng and Xilu Subdistricts to the south, Qinglonghu and Tanzhesi Towns to the west. The town had a population of 59,452 in 2020.

The name of Wangzuo Town was given during the Qing dynasty by a noble who chose to be buried in the region after his death.

History

Administrative Division 
As of 2021, Wangzuo Town consisted of 12 subdivisions, including 4 communities and 8 villages:

Tourism
Qinglong Lake Park (青龙湖公园) is located in Wangzuo.

See also 

 List of township-level divisions of Beijing

References 

Fengtai District
Towns in Beijing